Admiral Thompson may refer to:

Alan S. Thompson (born 1954), U.S. Navy vice admiral
Sir Charles Thompson, 1st Baronet (c. 1740–1799), British Royal Navy vice admiral
Donald C. Thompson (admiral) (born 1930), US. Coast Guard vice admiral
Norborne Thompson (c. 1769–1844), British Royal Navy vice admiral
Richard Thompson (Royal Navy officer) (born 1966), British Royal Navy vice admiral
Sir Thomas Thompson, 1st Baronet (1766–1828), British Royal Navy vice admiral
William Thompson (admiral) (1922–2018), U.S. Navy rear admiral

See also
Rolf Thomsen (1915–2003), German Navy flotilla admiral
Evelyn Thomson (1884–1941), British Royal Navy vice admiral